were legal red-light districts in Japanese history, where both brothels and prostitutes - known collectively as , the higher ranks of which were known as  - recognised by the Japanese government operated.

In spite of this, the legal sale of some sex acts and services continues to this day within Japan, circumventing the Anti-Prostitution Law either through the sale of acts that do not involve penetrative sex, or through the sale of sex only to customers who have first been 'acquainted' with prostitutes.

See also 
 
 
 Yoshiwara

References 

Brothels
Prostitution in Japan
Social history of Japan
Japanese courtesans
Japanese prostitutes
Japanese culture
Society of Japan
Sexuality in Japan
Japanese words and phrases